Russell Blew (born 7 November 1941) is a former Australian rules footballer who played with Essendon in the VFL during the 1960s. 

A pacy wingman, Blew debuted for Essendon in 1960. In 1964 he finished second in the best and fairest awards and represented Victoria at interstate football. He was a premiership player with Essendon in 1962 and 1965.

External links

Profile at Essendonfc.com

1941 births
Australian rules footballers from Victoria (Australia)
Essendon Football Club players
Essendon Football Club Premiership players
Waverley Football Club players
Living people
Two-time VFL/AFL Premiership players